Hyfaidd ap Bleddri (born ) was a king of Dyfed.

Triad 68"Three Kings who Sprang from Villeins"lists Hyfaidd among their number, meaning that his father Bleddri or Bledrig was held to have been a serf rather than a member of Dyfed's old royal family claiming descent from Aed Brosc. His mother was supposed to be Tangwystl, a daughter of the earlier King Owain.

Charles-Edwards argues that Hyfaidd was responsible for consolidating the lands that would later become Deheubarth, annexing Ystrad Tywi and possibly Ceredigion to Dyfed before his death. He was said to have oppressed the clerics of Meneva (modern St. David's) and exiled Bishop Nobis, earning him the enmity of Nobis's kinsman, the historian Asser.

Although later Welsh histories made Hywel Dda's inheritance of Dyfed a peaceful affair brought about by his marriage to Hyfaidd's granddaughter Elen and the extinction of Hyfaidd's male line, Asser's more contemporary Life of King Alfred reports that Dyfed or Brycheiniog both fell under such sustained attack from Hywel's uncle Anarawd and father Cadell that Kings Hyfaidd and Elise submitted to King Alfred of Wessex's overlordship in exchange for protection.

Hyfaidd's sons Llywarch and Rhodri reigned after him, but the kingdom was soon lost to Cadell's son Hywel who consolidated his realms as Deheubarth.

Children

 Llywarch
 Rhodri

References

9th-century Welsh monarchs
Monarchs of Dyfed